William Christopher (October 20, 1932  December 31, 2016) was an American actor and comedian, best known for playing Private Lester Hummel on Gomer Pyle, U.S.M.C. from 1965 to 1968 and Father John Mulcahy on the television series M*A*S*H from 1972 to 1983 and its spinoff AfterMASH from 1983 to 1985.

Early life
Christopher was born in Evanston, Illinois, in a family believed to be descendants of Paul Revere. He spent his youth in several of Chicago's northern suburbs, including Winnetka, Illinois, where he attended New Trier High School. Christopher graduated from Wesleyan University in Middletown, Connecticut, with a Bachelor of Arts in drama, focusing on Greek literature. While at university, he participated in fencing, soccer, and the glee club, and was initiated as a member of the Sigma Chi fraternity.

Career

Christopher moved to New York and appeared in a variety of regional productions and later a number of off-Broadway productions such as The Hostage at One Sheridan Square. His Broadway debut came in Beyond the Fringe, a British revue, acting alongside Peter Cook and Dudley Moore.

Christopher left New York City for Hollywood to attempt to gain work in television where he guest-starred in several well-known series, including The Andy Griffith Show, Death Valley Days, The Patty Duke Show and The Men from Shiloh. He made several appearances (each time as a different character) on Hogan's Heroes, and had recurring roles on Gomer Pyle, U.S.M.C. and That Girl. Christopher was a student at Harvey Lembeck’s famed L.A. improvisational workshop in the early 1970s during which time he performed improv skits (with two other performers, Carole White and Shelia Bartold, both also Lembeck students) during a January 1972 episode of The Carol Burnett Show. While the appearance was officially uncredited, he was introduced by Burnett as Bill Christopher.

In 1972, Christopher gained the role of Father Mulcahy in the television series M*A*S*H when the actor who was first cast in the role, George Morgan, was replaced after a single appearance in the pilot episode. Immediately following M*A*S*H, Christopher continued the role for the two seasons of the short-lived spin-off AfterMASH.

In feature films, Christopher performed in The Fortune Cookie, The Private Navy of Sgt. O'Farrell, The Shakiest Gun in the West, With Six You Get Eggroll, and Hearts of the West. He had parts in telefilms including The Movie Maker, The Perils of Pauline, and For the Love of It. The comedy film With Six You Get Eggroll is notable for fans of M*A*S*H because Jamie Farr and Christopher appear in it together, both playing hippies, five years before they co-starred in the series.

After gaining attention for M*A*S*H, Christopher appeared in various other television series, including Good Times (as the military doctor examining J.J. Evans) and Murder, She Wrote, and made multiple guest appearances on The Love Boat. In 1998, he guest-starred as a priest in an episode of Mad About You. He also remained active in the theater, including a tour of the United States in the mid-1990s with Farr, performing Neil Simon's The Odd Couple on stage. In 2008–2009, he toured with Church Basement Ladies.  One of Christopher's last roles was that of a priest (Father Tobias) on the daytime drama Days of Our Lives.

Charity work
Christopher, whose son Ned has autism, devoted much of his spare time to the National Autistic Society, doing public-service announcements to bring attention to autism. In 1985, his wife Barbara and he wrote Mixed Blessings, a book about their experiences in raising Ned.

Personal life
Christopher met his future wife Barbara on a blind date. They married in 1957 and the couple adopted two sons, John and Ned. The two appeared together in the M*A*S*H season 4 episode "Dear Mildred", where they sang the song "All Dressed Up and No Place to Go" in a duet.

Death
Christopher died at his home in Pasadena, California, on December 31, 2016. According to his son John Christopher, the 84-year-old actor died as the result of nonsmall-cell carcinoma (lung cancer). He had been diagnosed with cancer about 18 months earlier, according to his New York-based agent Robert Malcolm. His death came exactly one year after that of M*A*S*H co-star Wayne Rogers.

Partial filmography
1965: 12 O'Clock High (TV series, Episode: "Then Came the Mighty Hunter") as Patient
1965: Hank (TV series, Episode: "Candidate") as Elwood
1965: The Andy Griffith Show (TV series, 2 episodes) as Mr. Heathcote, IRS
1965–1968: Gomer Pyle, U.S.M.C. (TV series) as recurring character Private Lester Hummel
1965: Hogan's Heroes (TV series, 4 episodes) as multiple characters in 1965, 1966 and 1968
1966: The Patty Duke Show (TV series, Episode: "Three Little Kittens") as Man
1966: The Fortune Cookie as Intern
1967: The Perils of Pauline as Doctor (uncredited)
1967: The Andy Griffith Show (TV series, 1 episode) Thomas Peterson, MD
1968: The Private Navy of Sgt. O'Farrell as Pvt. Jake Schultz
1968: The Shakiest Gun in the West as Hotel Manager (uncredited)
1968: With Six You Get Eggroll as Zip-Cloud
1969: That Girl Season 4, Episode 14 as Chippy Dolan 
1972: The Carol Burnett Show Season 5, Episode 15 (January 5, 1972), uncredited appearance, performing improv skits as a student from Harvey Lembeck’s workshop with Carol White, and Shelia Bartold, introduced by Burnett as Bill Christopher 
1972–1983: M*A*S*H (TV series) as Father John Mulcahy
1975: Hearts of the West as Bank Teller
1975: Good Times (TV series, Episode: "The Enlistment") as The Doctor, Major Bullock
1983–1985: AfterMASH (TV series) as Father John Mulcahy
1985: Murder, She Wrote (TV series, Episode: "A Lady in the Lake") as Burton Hollis
1994: Heaven Sent as Priest
1998: Mad About You (TV series, Episode: "A Pain in the Neck") as Chaplain Olsen
2012: Days of Our Lives (TV series) as Father Tobias (final appearance)

References

External links

1932 births
2016 deaths
American male television actors
American male film actors
American male stage actors
Deaths from lung cancer in California
Male actors from Evanston, Illinois
Male actors from Pasadena, California
Writers from Evanston, Illinois
Autism activists
Wesleyan University alumni
New Trier High School alumni